Naevo is a Fijian surname. Notable people with the surname include:

Apisai Naevo (died 2008), Fijian politician and father of the following:
Apenisa Naevo (born 1973), Fijian rugby union player
Semisi Naevo (born 1976), Fijian rugby union player

Fijian-language surnames